Mosan art is a regional style of art from the valley of the Meuse in present-day Belgium, the Netherlands, and Germany. Although in a broader sense the term applies to art from this region from all periods, it generally refers to Romanesque art, with Mosan Romanesque architecture, stone carving, metalwork, enamelling and manuscript illumination reaching a high level of development during the 11th, 12th and 13th centuries.

The Meuse river valley lay in the heart of the earlier Carolingian Empire and therefore the style draws largely from the heritage of the Carolingian art tradition. Thus, Mosan art contains strong classical elements, which separates it from the international Romanesque style seen elsewhere during the period, for example in France, Germany Spain and Italy. However, it shares with mainstream Romanesque art elements such as the treatment of space. Although the iconography of 11th- and 12th-century Meuse valley art largely draws on Biblical inspiration, some of the elaborately carved capitals in the two main churches in Maastricht depict scenes from many aspects of daily life, as well as images from an intriguing world of fantasy.

Geographical spread
The Mosan region was formed largely by the boundary of the Bishopric of Liège, which had strong political links to the emperors of the Holy Roman Empire, as well as to the bishops of Cologne. The region's main artistic centres were the cities of Liège, Huy, Dinant, Namur, Tongeren, Maastricht, Roermond and Aachen, as well as a number of important monasteries: Sint-Truiden, Aldeneik, Herkenrode, Averbode, Munsterbilzen, Susteren, Sint Odiliënberg, Rolduc, Burtscheid, Kornelimünster, Stavelot, Nivelles, Aulne, Floreffe, Flône, Celles, Gembloux and Lobbes. Mosan art at its peak had a strong influence on bordering regions, notably on Rhineland art (Cologne, Bonn).

Highlights of Mosan art
Mosan Romanesque art has been described by art historians as the first golden age of Netherlandish art (before early Netherlandish painting and Dutch Golden Age painting). Usually the term Mosan art does not include Medieval literature although Heinrich von Veldeke may be considered the first poet writing in Middle Dutch (as well as Middle High German).

Architecture
Mosan architecture can be seen as a distinctive branch in Romanesque architecture, a regional style that produced imposing churches in Aachen, Liège and Maastricht, as well as monasteries in rural areas. The fully developed Mosan style of the 12th century is a comprise between the older Meuse valley traditions and foreign influences, mainly coming from the Rhineland and Italy. An outstanding factor in Mosan architecture is the closed west front (westwerk). Unfortunately, some of the largest churches, notably Liège cathedral, and the Stavelot and Sint-Truiden abbeys, were destroyed.
Former collegiate church St Bartholomew, Liège
 Former collegiate church of St. Denis (Liège)
 Former collegiate church St John, Liège
 Former collegiate church of Our Lady, Huy
 Former collegiate church Saint George and Saint Ode, Amay
 Former collegiate church Saint Étienne, Waha
 Former collegiate church of Fosses-la-Ville
 Former abbey church of Saint Gertrude, Nivelles
 Former abbey church of Saint Ursmer, Lobbes
 Former abbey church of Celles
 Basilica of Saint Servatius, Maastricht
 Basilica of Our Lady, Maastricht
 Former abbey church, Aldeneik
 Former abbey church, Rolduc
 Former abbey church, Susteren
 Former abbey church, Sint Odiliënberg
 Munsterkerk, Roermond
 Aachen Cathedral (westwork)

Stone carving
Mosan stone carving reached a peak in the 12th century in Maastricht, Liège and Nivelles. Maastricht 'metsen' (stone carvers) worked on capitals and reliefs as far afield as Utrecht, Bonn and Eisenach.
Carved capitals in western galleries of Basilica of Saint Servatius, Maastricht (12th century)
Carved capitals in East choir of Basilica of Our Lady, Maastricht (12th century)
Carved capitals in crypt of abbey church of Rolduc (12th century)
Vierge de Dom Rupert (12th century), Curtius Museum, Liège
Pierre Boudon relief (12th century), Curtius Museum, Liège
Samson Portal, Collegiate Church of Saint Gertrude, Nivelles
Baptismal font, Furnaux (Namur)
Oath on the Relics relief (12th century), Basilica of Our Lady, Maastricht
Majestas Domini tympanum (12th century), Basilica of Saint Servatius, Maastricht
Double relief choir screen (12th century), Basilica of Saint Servatius, Maastricht
Four-part relief in Saint Peter's Church, Utrecht

Metalwork
Metalwork has been considered the high art of the 12th and early 13th-century Meuse region, culminating in the work of Nicholas of Verdun, which is of exceptionally high quality. The Shrine of the Three Kings at Cologne Cathedral, the Anno Shrine in Siegburg and the Shrine of Our Lady in Tournai are among his best work. Other important metalworkers were Renier de Huy and Hugo d'Oignies.
Baptismal font at St Bartholomew's Church, Liège (early 12th century) by Renier de Huy
Shrine of Saint Servatius (±1165) in Maastricht
Shrine of Saint Hadelin (1170, partly 11th century) in Visé
Shrine of Saint Remacle in Stavelot
Shrines of Saint Domitian and Saint Mangold (by Godefroid de Huy, ±1172-1189) in Huy
Shrine of Our Lady (1205) at Tournai Cathedral by Nicholas of Verdun
Shrine of the Three Kings at Cologne Cathedral (1180) by Nicholas of Verdun
Shrine of Charlemagne (Karlsschrein, 1215) and Shrine of Mary (Marienschrein, 1238), Aachen Cathedral
Barbarossa Chandelier (1170), Aachen Cathedral
Retable of the Pentecost (1160–1170, Cluny Museum, Paris – )
Stavelot Triptych. Morgan Library, New York City
Reliquary of St. Maurus, now in Bečov nad Teplou
Stavelot altar base. Royal Museums of Art and History, Brussels
Reliquary with head of Pope Alexander I, Royal Museums of Art and History, Brussels
The foot of the so-called Cross of Saint Bertin. Museum of Saint-Omer

Painting, illumination and other works of art
Very little has come to us from what must have been an impressive body of Mosan murals. Wolfram von Eschenbach, in his Parzival expressed his high regard for Maastricht (and Cologne) painters (Parzival, 158, 13-16). Book illumination, like the rest of the arts, was at its zenith in the second half of the 12th century. The principal centres were the abbey of Saint Laurent in Liège and the abbeys of Stavelot and Lobbes. Another highly developed art was vitreous enameling.
Mural of the choir vault (heavily restored). Basilica of Saint Servatius, Maastricht
Stavelot Bible (11th century). British Library
 (12th century). British Library, London
Evangeliary of Averbode (12th century). University Library, Liège
Manuscripts from the abbey of Sint-Truiden
Evangeliary of Notger (10th-12th century)

See also
Romanesque art § Sculpture
Mosan Renaissance architecture
Tournai font

Notes

References
Chapman, Gretel (1987). "Mosan art". Dictionary of the Middle Ages. Volume 8. pp. 495–6
Hartog, Elizabeth den (2002). "Romanesque Sculpture in Maastricht"
Timmers, J.J.M. (1971). "De Kunst van het Maasland"
"Mosan school". In Encyclopædia Britannica Online.

External links
 

 
Romanesque art
Romanesque architecture
 
Vitreous enamel
Walloon culture
Limburgian culture
Buildings and structures in Liège Province
History of Liège Province
History of Belgian Limburg
Culture of Limburg (Netherlands)
History of Limburg (Netherlands)
Netherlandish Medieval art